Jorge Medina Vidal (1925 in Montevideo – 2008) was a Uruguayan poet, educator and literary critic.

He received his diploma at the Department of Humanities and Sciences of the Universidad de la República. As a member of that school, and of the Artigas Institute for Teachers, he taught at the secondary level.

Works
 Cinco sitios de poesía (1951)
 Para el tiempo que vivo (1955)
 Las Puertas (1962)
 Por modo extraño (1963)
 Las Terrazas (1964)
 Harpya destructor (1969)
 Situación anómala (1977)
 Poemas, poemenos (1981)
 Transparences (1987, ed. Eché, Toulouse - France) Bilingual poems authored with the French poet, Monique Ruffié de Saint-Blancat

References

1925 births
2008 deaths
People from Montevideo
Uruguayan educators
20th-century Uruguayan poets
Uruguayan male poets
Uruguayan literary critics
20th-century Uruguayan male writers